Paiporta is a municipality in the comarca of Horta Sud in the Valencian Community, Spain.

Twin towns
Paiporta is twinned with:

  Soliera, Italy

References 

Municipalities in the Province of Valencia
Horta Sud